Valentine Blacker CB (19 October 1778 – 4 February 1826), was a lieutenant colonel in the Honourable East India Company and later Surveyor General of India.

Life and career

Blacker was born in Armagh, Northern Ireland where his family has an ancestral home in the barony of Oneilland East.  He obtained a commission in the Madras Cavalry in 1798, was made a cornet in 1799, and aide-de-camp to a Colonel Stevenson in the Wayanad district in 1800, and quartermaster-general in 1810. He served in Deccan, 1817, and was promoted to lieutenant-colonel. His son, Maxwell, was born in June 1822.

Blacker took over from John Hodgson as Surveyor General of India in 1823. In this capacity he made substantial contributions to the ongoing Trigonometrical Survey of India. He was stationed in Calcutta from 1823 until his death there from a fever in 1826. He was buried in South Park Street Cemetery in Calcutta. Andrew Waugh said of him that "Blacker, with the exception of Col Everest, was the ablest and most scientific man that ever presided over this expensive department".

Writings
Blacker and his relative William Blacker were both lieutenant-colonels, and both were published authors. Because some of the work was published pseudonymously, the two are sometimes confused or conflated in texts.

His correspondence with his father concerning military and political news, as well as his observations about Indian life and culture, was published in 1798.

Blacker published a history of Maharashtra War, including discussion of the Battle of Khadki, in 1821.

References

British East India Company Army officers
Surveyors General of India
1778 births
1826 deaths
People from County Armagh
Companions of the Order of the Bath
British surveyors